Mário Jorge Pasquinha Évora (born 28 January 1999) is a Cape Verdean professional footballer who plays as a goalkeeper for São João de Ver and the Cape Verde national team.

Club career
Évora is a youth product of Porto, and began his senior career with Águeda in 2018 in the Campeonato de Portugal. He transferred to Vitória B on 2 August 2020. On 30 June 2022, his contract ended with Vitória B. Shortly after he transferred to São João de Ver for the 2022–23 season.

International career
Évora was first called up to the Cape Verde national team in October 2017. He made his professional debut with Cape Verde in a friendly 2–1 loss to Guinea on 10 October 2020.

References

External links
 
 
 

1999 births
Living people
People from São Vicente, Cape Verde
Cape Verdean footballers
Cape Verde international footballers
Association football goalkeepers
R.D. Águeda players
Vitória S.C. B players
SC São João de Ver players
Campeonato de Portugal (league) players
Cape Verdean expatriate footballers
Cape Verdean expatriates in Portugal
Expatriate footballers in Portugal